This list of the tallest buildings in Tacoma, Washington ranks the tallest buildings in Tacoma, Washington by height. The tallest building in Tacoma is the  1201 Pacific (formerly Wells Fargo Plaza). Tacoma is the 3rd largest city in Washington and part of the Seattle metropolitan area; its buildings rank below those in Seattle and Bellevue.

Tallest buildings
The following list ranks the tallest buildings in Tacoma by height. The list includes the rank of the building, the name of the building, the height of the building in feet and meters, the amount of floors the building has, the year the building built, and notes.

See also
List of tallest buildings in Seattle

References

Tacoma

Tallest In Tacoma